"Lido Shuffle" is a song written by Boz Scaggs and David Paich and introduced on the 1976 Boz Scaggs album Silk Degrees. It was subsequently released as a single in 1977.

Scaggs recalled: ""Lido Shuffle" was a song that I'd been banging around. I...took the idea of the shuffle [from] a song that Fats Domino did called "The Fat Man" that had a kind of driving shuffle beat that I used to play on the piano, and I just started kind of singing along with it. Then I showed it to Paich and he helped me fill it out. It ended up being "Lido Shuffle"."

The song was also adopted by the Philadelphia Eagles to play when cornerback Lito Sheppard would make an interception.

Song structure
"Lido Shuffle", written in the key of G major (as many of Scaggs' other memorable songs), uses the familiar I-IV-V chord progression that is foundation of blues, pop, and rock.  Unusually, however, it modulates up a minor third to the key of Bb for the chorus.

"Lido Shuffle" begins with an intro, followed by the first verse, the chorus, second verse, chorus again, an  instrumental bridge, and chorus.

Members of the backup band on "Lido Shuffle" include David Paich, Jeff Porcaro and David Hungate who later formed Toto.

Song performance
Released as the album's fourth single, "Lido Shuffle" reached number 11 in the US and 13 on the UK Singles Chart. In Australia the track spent three weeks at number 2 as a double A-side hit with "What Can I Say".

Personnel

 Boz Scaggs – lead vocals, guitar
 Fred Tackett –  guitar
 Louis Shelton – guitar
 David Hungate – bass
Jeff Porcaro — drums
David Paich — Hammond organ, piano, Minimoog, Moog synthesizer
 Vincent DeRosa – horns
 Jim Horn – horns
 Tony Terran – horns
 Paul Hubinon – horns
 Dick Hyde – horns
 Plas Johnson – horns
 Tom Scott – horns
 Bud Shank – horns

Chart performance

Weekly charts

Year-end charts

References

External links
 Lyrics of this song
 

1975 songs
1977 singles
Boz Scaggs songs
Songs written by Boz Scaggs
Songs written by David Paich
Song recordings produced by Joe Wissert
Columbia Records singles
CBS Records singles